The McDonnell Douglas KC-10 Extender is an American tanker aircraft operated by the United States Air Force (USAF). A military version of the three-engine DC-10 airliner, the KC-10 was developed from the Advanced Tanker Cargo Aircraft Program. It incorporates military-specific equipment for its primary roles of aerial refueling and transport. It was developed to supplement the KC-135 Stratotanker following experiences in Southeast Asia and the Middle East. The KC-10 was the second McDonnell Douglas transport aircraft to be selected by the Air Force following the C-9. A total of 60 KC-10s were produced for the USAF.  The Royal Netherlands Air Force operated two similar tankers designated KDC-10 that were converted from DC-10s.

The KC-10 plays a key role in the mobilization of US military assets, taking part in overseas operations far from home. These aircraft performed airlift and aerial refueling during the 1986 bombing of Libya (Operation Eldorado Canyon), the 1990–91 Gulf War with Iraq (Operations Desert Shield and Desert Storm), the NATO bombing of Yugoslavia (Operation Allied Force), War in Afghanistan (Operation Enduring Freedom), and Iraq War (Operations Iraqi Freedom and New Dawn).

Design and development

Advanced Tanker Cargo Aircraft Program

During the Vietnam War, doubts began to form regarding the Boeing KC-135 Stratotanker fleet's ability to meet the needs of the United States' global commitments. The aerial refueling fleet was deployed to Southeast Asia to support tactical aircraft and strategic bombers, while maintaining the U.S.-based support of the nuclear-bomber fleet. Consequently, the Air Force sought an aerial tanker with greater capabilities than the KC-135. In 1972, two DC-10s were flown in trials at Edwards Air Force Base, simulating air refuelings to check for possible wake issues. Boeing performed similar tests with a 747.

During the 1973 Yom Kippur War, the Air Force commenced Operation Nickel Grass to supply Israel with weapons and supplies. The operation demonstrated the necessity for adequate air-refueling capabilities; denied landing rights in Europe, C-5 Galaxy transports were forced to carry a fraction of their maximum payload on direct flights from the continental United States to Israel. To address this shortfall in mobility, in 1975, under the Advanced Tanker Cargo Aircraft Program, four aircraft were evaluated—the Lockheed C-5, the Boeing 747, the McDonnell Douglas DC-10, and the Lockheed L-1011. The only serious contenders were Boeing and McDonnell Douglas. On 19 December 1977, McDonnell Douglas's DC-10 was chosen. The primary reason of this choice was the KC-10's ability to operate from shorter runways. Initially, a batch of 12 aircraft was ordered, but this was later increased to 60.

KC-10 Extender
The KC-10 Extender first flew on 12 July 1980, but it was not until October the same year that the first aerial refuel sortie was performed. The design for the KC-10 involved modifications from the DC-10-30CF design. Unnecessary airline features were replaced by an improved cargo-handling system and military avionics. Meanwhile, the KC-10 retains 88% commonality with its commercial counterparts, giving it greater access to the worldwide commercial support system. Other changes from the DC-10-30CF include the removal of most windows and lower cargo doors. Early aircraft featured a distinctive light gray, white and blue paint scheme, but a gray-green camouflage scheme was used on later tankers. The paint scheme was switched to a medium gray color by the late 1990s.

The most notable changes were the addition of the McDonnell Douglas Advanced Aerial Refueling Boom and additional fuel tanks located in the baggage compartments below the main deck. The extra tanks increase the KC-10's fuel capacity to 356,000 lb (161,478 kg), nearly doubling the KC-135's capacity. The KC-10 has both a centerline refueling boom—unique in that it sports a control surface system at its aft end that differs from the V-tail design used on previous tankers—and a drogue-and-hose system on the starboard side of the rear fuselage. The KC-10 boom operator is seated in the rear of the aircraft with a wide window for monitoring refueling rather than prone as in the KC-135. The operator controls refueling operations through a digital fly-by wire system.

Unlike the KC-135, the KC-10's hose-and-drogue system allows refueling of Navy, Marine Corps, and most allied aircraft, all in one mission. The final twenty KC-10s produced included wing-mounted pods for added refueling locations. The KC-10 can also carry a complement of 75 personnel with 146,000 lb (66,225 kg) of cargo, or 170,000 lb (77,110 kg) in an all-cargo configuration.  The KC-10 has a side cargo door for loading and unloading cargo.  Handling equipment is required to raise and lower loads to the cargo opening.  It can carry cargo and serve as a tanker on overseas missions.

Further developments

A need for new transport aircraft for the Royal Netherlands Air Force (Koninklijke Luchtmacht) was first identified in 1984. The 1991 Gulf War highlighted the deficiencies in mobility of European forces.  In 1991 four categories of transport requirements were established. Category A required a large cargo aircraft with a range of at least 4,500 km and the capability to refuel F-16s. In 1992, two DC-10-30CFs were acquired from Martinair in a buy/leaseback contract. When one of the two aircraft was lost in the Martinair Flight 495 crash, a third aircraft was bought from Martinair.

The conversion was handled via the United States foreign military sales program, which in turn contracted McDonnell Douglas. Costs for the conversion were initially estimated at $89.5 million (FY 1994). The aircraft were to be equipped with both a boom and a probe and drogue system. However, because McDonnell Douglas did not have any experience with the requested Remote Aerial Refueling Operator (RARO) system, and because the third aircraft differed from the original two, the program could not be completed at budget. By omitting the probe and drogue system and a fixed partition wall between the cargo and passenger, the cost could be limited at $96 million. To make up for the cost increase McDonnell Douglas hired Dutch companies to do part of the work. The conversion of the aircraft was performed by KLM and was done from October 1994 to September 1995 for the first aircraft and from February to December 1995 for the second. This was much longer than planned, mostly because McDonnell Douglas delivered the parts late. This would have again increased the cost, but in the contract for the AH-64 Apaches which the Royal Netherlands Air Force also bought from McDonnell Douglas, the price was agreed to be kept at $96 million.

After McDonnell Douglas did the KDC-10 conversion for the Royal Netherlands Air Force in 1992, they proposed a tanker/transport version of the MD-11CF which had the in-house designation KMD-11. MDC offered either conversion of second hand aircraft (KMD-11) or new build aircraft (KC-10B), the proposed KMD-11 offered 35,000 lbs more cargo capacity and 8,400 lbs more transferable fuel than the KC-10A. It was offered to the RNAF and Royal Saudi Air Force (RSAF) in the 1990s and the Royal Australian Air Force (RAAF) in the early 2000s.

To modernize the KC-10, the USAF has awarded a contract to Boeing in 2010 to upgrade the fleet of 59 aircraft with new Communication, navigation and surveillance and air traffic management (CNS/ATM) system. This was to allow the aircraft to fly in civil airspace as new ICAO and FAA standards took effect in 2015.  Rockwell Collins was also awarded a contract in 2011 for avionics and systems integration for the cockpit modernization program.

Operational history

United States
The first KC-10 was delivered to the Air Force's Strategic Air Command (SAC) in March 1981 at Barksdale AFB. In 1982 a newly renamed 22nd Air Refueling Wing (formerly the 22nd Bombardment Wing) was re-equipped with KC-10A Extenders and became the 2nd Air Force Unit to operate the new tankers. The 60th and final KC-10 was delivered on 29 November 1988.  The KC-10s served with SAC until 1992, when they were reassigned to the newly established Air Mobility Command. In the aerial refueling role, the KC-10s have been operated largely in the strategic refueling of large number of tactical aircraft on ferry flights and the refueling of other strategic transport aircraft. Conversely, the KC-135 fleet has operated largely in the in-theater tactical role. There are 59 KC-10 Extenders in service with the USAF as of 2010. The USAF's KC-10s are stationed primarily at Travis AFB, California, and McGuire AFB, now part of Joint Base McGuire-Dix-Lakehurst, in New Jersey.

When faced with refusals of basing and overflight rights from continental European countries during Operation El Dorado Canyon, the U.S. was forced to use the UK-based F-111s in the 1986 air-strikes against Libya. The KC-10s and KC-135s allowed 29 F-111s, along with other Air Force and Navy aircraft, to reach their targets. The KC-10 again played a key role during Operations Desert Shield and Desert Storm in 1991; KC-10s facilitated the deployment of tactical, strategic, and transport aircraft to Saudi Arabia. In the early stages of Operation Desert Shield, aerial refueling was key to the rapid airlift of materiel and forces. In addition to refueling airlift aircraft, the KC-10, along with the smaller KC-135, moved thousands of tons of cargo and thousands of troops in support of the massive buildup. The KC-10 and the KC-135 conducted about 51,700 separate refueling operations and delivered 125 million gallons (475 million liters) of fuel without missing a single scheduled rendezvous.

Since then, the KC-10 had participated in other smaller conflicts. In March 1999, NATO launched Operation Allied Force against the government of Yugoslavia. The mobility portion of the operation began in February and was heavily dependent on tankers. By early May 1999, some 150 KC-10s and KC-135s deployed to Europe where they refueled bombers, fighters and support aircraft engaged in the conflict. The KC-10 flew 409 missions throughout the entire Allied Force campaign and continued support operations in Kosovo. Since 11 September 2001, KC-10s had also flown more than 350 missions guarding U.S. skies as a part of Operation Noble Eagle. During Operations Enduring Freedom and Iraqi Freedom, KC-10s have flown more than 1,390 missions delivering critical air refueling support to numerous joint and Coalition receiver aircraft. As of 2004, KC-10s were expected to serve until 2043.

The Air Force considered retiring its fleet of KC-10 tankers in response to sequestration budget cuts as part of the service's FY 2015 budget.  A "vertical chop" to divest all KC-10s was suggested because there are fewer KC-10s than KC-135s, having three different tanker models in service (after the introduction of the KC-46) would be costly, and a "horizontal cut" across the refueling fleets would achieve small efficiencies. Some believed retiring the KC-10 would not benefit the Air Force, given that it is equipped with both boom and hose-and-drogue refueling systems and the fleet's relatively young age. At first, officials claimed that the initial focus on retiring the KC-10 in September 2013 was a "trial balloon" to call attention to Air Force operating cost issues; as of early 2013, the KC-10 had a per hour flying cost of $21,170 and a mission capable rate of 87 percent. A FY 2015 budget plan did not include cuts to the KC-10.  On 13 July 2020, the first US KC-10 to be retired, tail number 86-0036, was transferred to the 309th Aerospace Maintenance and Regeneration Group (AMARG) at Davis Monthan Air Force Base, Arizona.

Netherlands

The two Dutch KDC-10s were used for both refueling and transport. They were stationed on Eindhoven Airport as part of the 334th Transport Squadron. Of the 5,500 hours flown in the first 3 years of use, the aircraft were used in their tanker role for 50% of the time. Besides being used by the air force and NATO allies, the KDC-10s were also used to support peacekeeping and humanitarian aid operations. Of the first three years, 32% of the flight hours were used for peacekeeping and humanitarian aid.

In this function, the aircraft was deployed to Kosovo to evacuate refugees, to the Caribbean and Central America to provide humanitarian aid after the hurricanes Luis, Georges and Mitch and to various countries in Africa and Asia to provide development aid. In 1998, the aircraft were also used to evacuate Dutch citizens from Indonesia during the Fall of Suharto. Dutch KDC-10s operated out of Manas AFB in support of allied forces during Operation Enduring Freedom and in support of Allied Air Force over Iraq and Syria.

A third DC-10, registered T-255 was acquired and served for three years before being withdrawn from service in April 2014 due to Dutch defense cuts and flown to Newquay Airport for scrapping. The KDC-10s in Dutch service were replaced with the Airbus A330 MRTT. The first aircraft, registered T-264/'Prins Bernhard' and due for a major service, was withdrawn from use on 1 November 2019, prior to being transferred to its new owner, Omega Aerial Refueling Services on 4 November 2019. The last KDC-10, registered T-235/'Jan Scheffer' remained in Dutch service until it was retired on 7 October 2021. The aircraft subsequently left The Netherlands bound for service with Omega in the U.S. on 25 October 2021.

Civilian operators

Commercial refueling companies Omega Aerial Refueling Services and Global Airtanker Service operate two KDC-10 tankers (N974VV and N852V, respectively) for lease. They were converted from DC-10-40s and provide probe and drogue refueling capabilities from wing pods similar to the KC-10.

In June and July 2011, Omega Air's KDC-10 supported 3 of Royal Australian Air Force's F/A-18 Hornets, en route to Red Flag – Alaska.

In 2019, Omega agreed to purchase the Netherlands' two KDC-10s, with one being received in November 2019, and the second delivered in October 2021.

Operators

United States Air Force – 58 KC-10 aircraft in use as of July 2020
Strategic Air Command
2nd Bomb Wing – Barksdale AFB, Louisiana 1981–1992
2d Air Refueling Squadron 1989–1992
32d Air Refueling Squadron 1981–1992
4th Wing – Seymour-Johnson AFB, North Carolina 1991–1992
344th Air Refueling Squadron
911th Air Refueling Squadron
22d Air Refueling Wing – March AFB, California 1982–1992
6th Air Refueling Squadron 1989–1992
9th Air Refueling Squadron 1982–1992
22d Air Refueling Squadron 1982–89
68th Air Refueling Group/Wing – Seymour-Johnson AFB 1982–1991
344th Air Refueling Squadron 1986–1991
911th Air Refueling Squadron 1982–1991
802d Air Refueling Wing – Lajes Air Base, Azores 1990–1991
802d Air Refueling Squadron
1709th Air Refueling Wing – King Abdul Aziz Air Base, Saudi Arabia 1990–1991
1710th Air Refueling Squadron
Air Mobility Command
22d Air Refueling Wing – March AFB 1992–1994
6th Air Refueling Squadron
9th Air Refueling Squadron
458th Operations Group – Barksdale AFB 1992–1994
2d Air Refueling Squadron
32d Air Refueling Squadron
4th Operations Group – Seymour-Johnson AFB 1992–1995
344th Air Refueling Squadron 1992-1994
711th Air Refueling Squadron 1994-1994
744th Air Refueling Squadron 1994-1995
911th Air Refueling Squadron 1992-1994
60th Air Mobility Wing – Travis AFB, California 1994–present
6th Air Refueling Squadron 1995–present
9th Air Refueling Squadron 1994–present
305th Air Mobility Wing – McGuire AFB, New Jersey 1994–present
2d Air Refueling Squadron 1994-2021
32d Air Refueling Squadron
380th Air Expeditionary Wing – Al Dhafra Air Base, United Arab Emirates 2002–present
908th Expeditionary Air Refueling Squadron
722d Air Refueling Wing – March AFB 1994–1996
6th Air Refueling Squadron 1994–1996
9th Air Refueling Squadron 1994
Air Force Reserve Command
98th Air Refueling Group (Associate) – Barksdale AFB 1987–1994
78th Air Refueling Squadron
452d Air Refueling Wing (Associate) – March AFB 1981–1995
78th Air Refueling Squadron 1981–1987
79th Air Refueling Squadron 1982–1995
349th Air Mobility Wing (Associate) – Travis AFB 1994–present
70th Air Refueling Squadron 1994–present
79th Air Refueling Squadron 1995–present
514th Air Mobility Wing (Associate) – McGuire AFB 1994–present
76th Air Refueling Squadron 1994-2022
78th Air Refueling Squadron
916th Air Refueling Group (Associate) – Seymour-Johnson 1985–1994
77th Air Refueling Squadron

 Royal Netherlands Air Force operates a single KDC-10, which together with another former RNLAF KDC-10 were sold to Omega Aerial Refueling Services, the latter already delivered to a new owner. The Dutch tankers are being replaced by two Airbus A330 MRTTs to be owned by NATO as part of the Multinational Multi-Role Tanker Transport Fleet (MMF). A DC-10 transport, registered T-255 served for three years before being withdrawn from service in April 2014 due to Dutch defence cuts.
 334 Squadron – Eindhoven Airport

Incidents
On 17 September 1987, KC-10A serial number 82-0190 was undergoing maintenance on the ground at Barksdale AFB, Louisiana, and suffered an explosion and subsequent fire. The KC-10 was significantly damaged and written off. One member of the ground crew died in the fire.

Specifications (KC-10A)

See also

References
Notes

Citations

Bibliography

External links

 KC-10 page on Boeing.com
 USAF KC-10 fact sheet
 KC-10 fact sheet on TheAviationZone.com
 KDC-10 in the Dutch Air Force
 KC-10 CLS Competition
 

1980s United States military tanker aircraft
Air refueling
Trijets
Low-wing aircraft
Aircraft first flown in 1980